O. lepidus may refer to:
 Olios lepidus, a huntsman spider species
 Opilio lepidus, a harvestman species
 Oxyopes lepidus, a hunting spider species

See also
 Lepidus (disambiguation)